Panudech Maiwong (born January 13, 1996) is a Thai footballer who plays as a midfielder or forward.

Club career
Starting his career at Chonburi-based side Chonburi F.C., Maiwong was loaned to Hong Kong Premier League side Hong Kong Rangers in 2015 on a 3-month deal, having impressed in a friendly game between the two clubs. However he was injured in training and failed to make a first team appearance, returning to Chonburi later the same year. He made his professional debut for Chonburi on 8 March 2017, coming on as a substitute for Kroekrit Thaweekarn in a 3–1 win over Super Power F.C.

Career statistics

Club

References

1996 births
Living people
Panudech Maiwong
Panudech Maiwong
Association football forwards
Association football midfielders
Hong Kong Rangers FC players
Panudech Maiwong
Panudech Maiwong
Thai expatriate footballers
Expatriate footballers in Hong Kong
Thai expatriate sportspeople in Hong Kong
Panudech Maiwong
Panudech Maiwong